The 2012 Great Yarmouth Council election was held on 3 May 2012 to elect members of Great Yarmouth Council, alongside nationwide local elections.

References

2012 English local elections
2012
2010s in Norfolk